Simcha Shirman (Born 1947) is a German-born Israeli photographer and educator.

Biography

Early life
Simcha Shearman was born in 1947 to Batya and David, both Holocoust survivors. He was born in Saint Ottilien Convent, which was converted by USA occupation authorities to a soldier and refugee hospital after WWII. His birth certificate states that he is a displaced person. The small family immigrated to Israel in May 1948 and settled in the city of Acre. Shirman got the first camera when he was 12 - a relative from America who visited Israel gave it to him and at the age of 15 purchased and set up a photo lab in the bathroom of the small house in Acre's neighborhoods. Shirman did his military service in 1965 in the Shaked patrol unit, as an officer and commander in the patrol. 
In 1970, Shirman decided to go to New York to study photography. In 1972, Shirman began his undergraduate studies at the School of Visual Arts, and in 1976 continued his graduate studies at the Pratt Institute, where he studied with Arthur Fried and where he met and befriended Philip Perkis. Upon graduation in 1978 and receiving the M.F.A. in photography and art, Shirman returned to Israel with his family to the city of Tel Aviv.

Career
From the beginning of his career, in the tradition of American photography and European photography, Shirman has been involved in his photographs with personal and collective biographical subjects related to the existence of Israeli land, history, memory, the Holocaust, family, Israeli army, portraits, changing landscapes and sea. Through these topics, Shirman discusses complex questions related to the place and existence. Shirman's life, his family, immediate and distant environment, the landscapes in which he lives and revolves, his childhood experiences and subconscious memories, questions of sexuality, existence, identity and life and death, are all the materials he examines and processes in his artistic work. 

In dealing with the meaning and understanding of Holocaust memory and their impact on the present and future, on the existing and fictitious family albums and on the family itself, in the German, Polish and Israeli landscapes, Shirman tackles contemporary existential questions, the victim's image and the victim, the attitude toward, and the social-cultural, social- Guard towers and hunters - pastoral still life with threatening and threatening memory.

Shearman's difficult experiences as a commander in the First Lebanon War, during long reserve periods in Lebanon and in the Occupied Territories during the Intifada, he brought to his many exhibitions and also words and pictures in the then "reputation" magazine. As a resident of Ramat Aviv in its early days as housing for young couples, Shirman accompanied and documented the changing boundaries of the northern city of Tel Aviv. During his travels to Bezalel, he followed the changes in the landscape and environment in the Modi'in area, when he came to Jerusalem. Acre, his childhood town, is the subject of his work, focusing on the Old City and its alleys, horses, old and new architecture, the Muslim cemetery and the sea.

Shearman also photographed the sea in Tel Aviv with reference to the horizon line - a meeting of the sea and the sky - and the space of existence and daily and sometimes unattainable occurrences, in endless grays.

References

1947 births
Living people
Israeli photographers